Rezalak (also Romanized as Reẕālak; also known as ‘Alī Gardeh and ‘Alī Gerdeh) is a village in Beshiva Pataq Rural District, in the Central District of Sarpol-e Zahab County, Kermanshah Province, Iran. At the 2006 census, its population was 197, in 43 families.

References 

Populated places in Sarpol-e Zahab County